This is a list of Japanese films that were released, or are scheduled to release in 2019.

Highest-grossing films
The following is a list of the 10 highest-grossing Japanese films released at the Japanese box office during 2019.

Film releases

January – March

April – June

July – September

October – December

See also
 2019 in Japan
 2019 in Japanese television
 List of 2019 box office number-one films in Japan

References

External links
 

Film
2019
Lists of 2019 films by country or language